"My Life"  (stylized as "m y . l i f e") is a song by rappers J. Cole, 21 Savage and Morray. It is the third track from Cole's sixth studio album, The Off-Season, released on May 14, 2021. The song features the hook of "The Life" (2002) by American rapper Styles P, as interpolated by Morray. The song was sent to rhythmic contemporary radio in the United States on May 25, 2021, as the album's first single. The single debuted at number two on the Billboard Hot 100 chart, becoming Cole's highest charting single in the country, surpassing the number four peak of "Middle Child". It is also Morray’s highest-charting song, surpassing his single "Quicksand" which peaked at number 65 and 21 Savage's highest-charting song as a lead artist (tying "Rich Flex" with Drake), overall behind his features on Post Malone's number-one hit "Rockstar" and Drake's number-one hit "Jimmy Cooks".

The song received two nominations at the 64th Annual Grammy Awards for Best Rap Song and Best Rap Performance respectively.

Background
The song marks the second time Cole and Savage collaborated on a song, first time being "A Lot" (2019). Savage also appears in Cole's documentary Applying Pressure: The Off-Season. Cole and Morray were first linked in 2020, when Cole praised Morray's song "Quicksand", which led to speculations about a possible remix of the song.

Composition
"My Life" features a notable switch-up in Cole's delivery, which starts "with a chilled out, melancholy feel" and changes to a "harder, razor-sharp tone". The lyrics see Cole and Savage exploring "how tragedy and hardship led them to develop strong characters", while "Morray's hook ties together the track with an homage to Styles P and Pharaohe Monch". Furthermore, Cole reflects his way of attaining financial success and wealth. In the context of the album, the song, along with "Applying Pressure", were seen as "playful statements of Cole's separation from other rappers". Cole name-drops American basketball player Ja Morant on the song.

Critical reception
Carl Lammare of Billboard highlighted the contrast between Cole's and Savage's "styles and personalities", though both "prove how formidable they can be as a unit and that together, they can wreak havoc on any given track". Varun Krishan of The Indian Express praised the song, noting the "great lyrics, impeccable flow and excellent delivery" combined with a "smooth and soothing" hook, as well as a beat with a "vocal melody infused to it which enhances the sound to match the vibe the creators are trying to produce". Matthew Strauss at Pitchfork thought that neither Cole or 21 Savage had to adapt each other's style in order to fit on the song, instead the collaboration shows "that Cole wants to be seen as a connective tissue instead of some sort of anti-hype iconoclast". In comparison to the duo's first collaboration, Frazier Tharpe of GQ called the song "a banging companion".

Awards and nominations

Charts

Weekly charts

Year-end charts

Certifications

References

2021 singles
2021 songs
J. Cole songs
21 Savage songs
Dreamville Records singles
Interscope Records singles
Morray songs
Roc Nation singles
Songs written by 21 Savage
Songs written by J. Cole